Abrar Qazi is an Indian television actor. He is best known for portraying Rudraksh Khurana in Yeh Hai Chahatein and Raghu Jadhav in Gathbandhan.

Early life
Abrar Qazi was born on 3 August 1992 in Srinagar, Jammu & Kashmir, India.

Career
Qazi debuted as Zaid in 2018 with Imtiaz Ali's romance Laila Majnu and also appeared as Kareem in Prime Video's web series The Family Man.

In January 2019, he progressed into Hindi television as the lead Raghu Jadhav, a Dombivli gangster who falls for a police officer in Colors TV's Gathbandhan opposite Shruti Sharma.

Just after Gathbandhan ended in November 2019, Qazi replaced Karan Wahi as the lead rockstar, Rudraksh Khurana, opposite Sargun Kaur Luthra in Ekta Kapoor's drama series Yeh Hai Chahatein on Star Plus. The show has proved to be a turning point for his career, gaining him widespread love and attention for his acting as well as romantic chemistry with Luthra, making the duo very popular.

Filmography

Films

Television

Web series

Awards and Nominations

References

External links

 

Living people
Indian male film actors
Kashmiri people
Male actors in Hindi cinema
Male actors in Hindi television
21st-century Indian male actors
1993 births